Mihaylovski Cove is the 5 km wide cove indenting for 1.3 km the northwest coast of South Bay in Livingston Island, Antarctica that is entered west of Ereby Point and east of Lukovo Point, and has its head fed by Kamchiya Glacier. The area was known to early 19th century sealers who operated from nearby Johnsons Dock. The feature is named after the brothers Petar Mihaylovski, physician at St. Kliment Ohridski base during the 2007/08 and subsequent seasons, and Hristo Mihaylovski, engineer in the national Antarctic campaign during 2015/16 and subsequent seasons.

Location
British mapping in 1968, Chilean in 1971, Argentine in 1980, and Bulgarian in 2005, 2009 and 2017.

Related features

Lukovo Point
Lukovo Point is the mostly ice-free point on the northwest coast of South Bay in Livingston Island, Antarctica projecting 200 m southwards. It is surmounted by Krakra Bluff on the north. The feature is named after the settlements Lukovo in Western Bulgaria, and Gorno (Upper) and Dolno (Lower) Lukovo in Southern Bulgaria. Interactive image.

Memorable Beach
The feature was named Playa Memorable by Spain circa 1991. Interactive image.

Nessie Rock
Nessie Rock is the rock at the entrance to Mihaylovski Cove in the northwest of South Bay, Livingston Island in Antarctica 111 m long in southeast–northwest direction and 50 m wide, with a surface area of 0.4 ha. Bulgarian mapping in 2009 and 2017. The feature is so named because of its shape supposedly resembling the mythical Loch Ness monster. Interactive image.

Maps
 L.L. Ivanov et al. Antarctica: Livingston Island and Greenwich Island, South Shetland Islands. Scale 1:100000 topographic map. Sofia: Antarctic Place-names Commission of Bulgaria, 2005
 L.L. Ivanov. Antarctica: Livingston Island and Greenwich, Robert, Snow and Smith Islands. Scale 1:120000 topographic map.  Troyan: Manfred Wörner Foundation, 2009.  
 L.L. Ivanov. Antarctica: Livingston Island and Smith Island. Scale 1:100000 topographic map. Manfred Wörner Foundation, 2017. 
 Antarctic Digital Database (ADD). Scale 1:250000 topographic map of Antarctica. Scientific Committee on Antarctic Research (SCAR). Since 1993, regularly upgraded and updated

Notes

References
 Bulgarian Antarctic Gazetteer. Antarctic Place-names Commission. (details in Bulgarian, basic data in English)
 Mihaylovski Cove. SCAR Composite Gazetteer of Antarctica

External links
 Mihaylovski Cove. Copernix satellite image

Coves of Livingston Island
Headlands of Livingston Island
Beaches of Livingston Island
Rock formations of Livingston Island
Bulgaria and the Antarctic